David Eckersley (born 10 October 1948 is an English former professional rugby league footballer who played in the 1960s, 1970s and 1980s.

Background
Eckersley was born in Leigh, Lancashire, and as of 2012, he lives in Sydney, Australia.

Playing career

International honours
Dave Eckersley won caps for England while at St Helens in 1975 against France (sub), in the 1975 Rugby League World Cup against Wales (sub), and France (sub), while at Widnes in 1977 against Wales (sub), in 1978 against Wales (sub), and won caps for Great Britain while at St Helens in 1973 against Australia (sub), and Australia, and in 1974 against Australia (sub), and played right-, i.e. number 3, in the 16-11 victory over Australia at Sydney Cricket Ground on Saturday 6 July 1974.

Challenge Cup Final appearances
Dave Eckersley played , scored a try, and 40-yard drop goal in Leigh's 24-7 victory over Leeds in the 1971 Challenge Cup Final during the 1970–71 season at Wembley Stadium, London on Saturday 15 May 1971, played  in Widnes' 5-20 defeat by St. Helens in the 1976 Challenge Cup Final during the 1975–76 season at Wembley Stadium, London on Saturday 8 May 1976, played left-, i.e. number 4, in the 7-16 defeat by Leeds in the 1977 Challenge Cup Final during the 1976–77 season at Wembley Stadium, London on Saturday 7 May 1977, and played , and scored a drop goal in the 12-3 victory over Wakefield Trinity in the 1979 Challenge Cup Final during the 1978–79 season at Wembley Stadium, London on Saturday 5 May 1979.

County Cup Final appearances
Dave Eckersley played  in Leigh's 2-11 defeat by Swinton in the 1969 Lancashire County Cup Final during the 1969–70 season at Central Park, Wigan on Saturday 1 November 1969, played , and scored a try in the 7-4 victory over St. Helens in the 1970 Lancashire County Cup Final during the 1970–71 season at Station Road, Swinton on Saturday 28 November 1970, played  in Widnes' 16-11 victory over Workington Town in the 1976 Lancashire County Cup Final during the 1976–77 season at Central Park, Wigan on Saturday 30 October 1976, played  in the 15-13 victory over Workington Town in the 1978 Lancashire County Cup Final during the 1978–79 season at Central Park, Wigan on Saturday 7 October 1978, and played  in the 11-0 victory over Workington Town in the 1979 Lancashire County Cup Final during the 1979–80 season at The Willows, Salford on Saturday 8 December 1979.

BBC2 Floodlit Trophy Final appearances
Dave Eckersley played  in Leigh's 11-6 victory over Wigan in the 1969 BBC2 Floodlit Trophy Final during the 1969–70 season at Central Park, Wigan on Tuesday 16 December 1969, and played  in Widnes 13-7 victory over St. Helens in the 1978 BBC2 Floodlit Trophy Final during the 1978–79 season at Knowsley Road, St. Helens on Tuesday 12 December 1978.

Player's No.6 Trophy/John Player Final appearances
Dave Eckersley played  in Widnes' 4-9 defeat by Warrington in the 1977–78 Players No.6 Trophy Final during the 1977–78 season at Knowsley Road, St. Helens on Saturday 28 January 1978, played , and was man of the match in the 16-4 victory over Warrington in the 1978–79 John Player Trophy Final during the 1978–79 season at Knowsley Road, St. Helens on Saturday 28 April 1979, and played  in the 0-6 defeat by Bradford Northern in the 1979–80 John Player Trophy Final during the 1979–80 season at Headingley Rugby Stadium, Leeds on Saturday 5 January 1980.

References

External links
Profile at saints.org.uk
Statistics at rugby.widnes.tv
English Forwards Unknown Quantity

1948 births
Living people
Cronulla-Sutherland Sharks players
England national rugby league team players
English rugby league players
Great Britain national rugby league team players
Lancashire rugby league team players
Leigh Leopards players
London Broncos players
Place of birth missing (living people)
Rugby league centres
Rugby league five-eighths
Rugby league fullbacks
Rugby league players from Leigh, Greater Manchester
St Helens R.F.C. players
Widnes Vikings players